Trinity Health is the name of several organizations including:

 Trinity Health (Livonia, Michigan)
 Trinity Health (Minot, North Dakota)